Gary Michael Gurbin (born 13 December 1941 in Essex, Ontario) was a Progressive Conservative party member of the House of Commons of Canada. He is a physician by career.

He won the Bruce—Grey electoral district seat in the 1979 federal election and was re-elected there in the 1980 and 1984 federal elections. He left federal politics in 1988 and did not campaign in the following national election. 31st, 32nd and 33rd Canadian Parliaments.

Gurbin resigned from the Progressive Conservative party on 17 December 1981, citing concerns over party leader Joe Clark. He remained in the House of Commons as an independent member until rejoining the party on 28 January 1982.

References

External links
 
 

1941 births
Living people
Members of the House of Commons of Canada from Ontario
People from Essex, Ontario
Progressive Conservative Party of Canada MPs